Saint-Hilaire-de-Loulay is a former commune in the Vendée department in the Pays de la Loire region in western France. On 1 January 2019, it was merged into the new commune Montaigu-Vendée.

Monuments

The Château de la Preuille, one of the oldest castles in the Loire region, is located here.

Restaurant naming 
Saint-Hilaire-de-Loulay is the home town of Thierry Rautureau.  His restaurant "Loulay" is named to reflect his home town.

See also
Communes of the Vendée department

References

Former communes of Vendée
Vendée communes articles needing translation from French Wikipedia